Politiko is a Filipino news website covering Philippine politics. Politiko was formed in 2014 by two veteran journalists. In 2016, Politiko became one of the top media sites in the Philippines just after its first 2 years online marking its presence among social media users.

History
Politiko started its operation and presence in the social media in November 2014. It first focused on current political events within Metro Manila, then Politiko expanded its scope region wide adding Central Luzon, North Luzon, Mindanao, Bicol/MIMAROPA and Visayas.

Book launching
Politiko released a political almanac called Politiko 365 in 2017 which were attended by influential politicians including former Philippine President Benigno Aquino III. The second edition of the book was also published in 2018.

References 

Philippine political websites
Internet properties established in 2014
Companies based in Quezon City
Philippine journalism organizations
Mass media in Metro Manila